'The Bush Advocate' was a newspaper published in  Dannevirke, Hawke's Bay, New Zealand.

History 
The newspaper was first published on 8 May 1888 in Dannevirke. In 1912 it was sold and merged with the Dannevirke Evening News.

References 

Newspapers published in New Zealand
Dannevirke
Publications established in 1888
1888 establishments in New Zealand